Fifth Generation Systems, Inc., was a computer security company founded October 1984 in Baton Rouge, Louisiana, United States by Robert Mitchell, Leroy Mitchell, Roger Ivey, and Bruce Ray.  All four later left the company. Fifth Generation's initial commercial product was FastBack, the first practical hard disk backup program for the IBM PC.

Software by Fifth Generation Systems includes:
 CopyDoubler (Mac) – system utility for speeding up file copies and managing file copy queues
 DiskDoubler (Mac) – on-the-fly hard drive compression software
 DiskLock (PC, Mac) – security software incorporating access control and encryption
 FastBack (PC, Mac) – hard disk backup utility
 PowerStation (Mac)
 Public Utilities (Mac) – software with disk optimization, repair, and data recovery functions, developed by Sentient Software
 Pyro! (Mac) – screensaver that displayed fireworks among other user-selectable displays
 Search&Destroy (PC) – online and offline virus scanner for DOS and Windows, included in Novell DOS 7
 Suitcase (Mac) – font management utility
 Super Laser Spool and Super Spool (Mac) – print spoolers, acquired from Supermac Technology in 1990
 Direct Access – a menu system software for DOS.

The company was acquired by Symantec on October 4, 1993, for US$53.8 million.

References

Defunct software companies of the United States
Companies based in Baton Rouge, Louisiana
American companies established in 1984
Software companies established in 1984
Software companies disestablished in 1993
1984 establishments in Louisiana
1993 disestablishments in Louisiana
Gen Digital acquisitions